Glenrock early coalmining sites is a heritage-listed former coal mine and now recreation Park at Glenrock State Conservation Area, City of Lake Macquarie and City of Newcastle, New South Wales, Australia. It is also known as Industrial Archaeological Site. The property is owned by Office of Environment and Heritage (State Government). It was added to the New South Wales State Heritage Register on 2 April 1999.

Heritage listing 
Glenrock early coalmining sites was listed on the New South Wales State Heritage Register on 2 April 1999.

See also

References

Bibliography

Attribution 

New South Wales State Heritage Register
Mines in New South Wales
Parks in New South Wales
Coal mines in New South Wales
Articles incorporating text from the New South Wales State Heritage Register
City of Lake Macquarie
City of Newcastle